"Walking Contradiction" is a song by American rock band Green Day, released as a promotional single from their fourth album Insomniac. Also the closing track on the album, the song reached number 21 on the Modern Rock Tracks in August 1996. The riff of this song was used as the guitar solo for "Haushinka" on the demo version on their previous album Dookie (with the final version of the song appearing on their follow-up album Nimrod).

Track listing
"Walking Contradiction" (radio edit) – 2:31

Music video
Directed by Roman Coppola and mostly filmed in San Pedro, Los Angeles, California, the video features the trio going about in a town casually causing accidents, explosions, and mayhem, unaware of their actions. At the end of the video, they all meet up with each other, get into a car and drive off, just as a building collapses. The music video received a Grammy nomination for "Best Music Video, Short Form" at the 39th Grammy Awards in 1997.

Chart positions

Other versions
 A live version appears on the 1996 Green Day live EP, Bowling Bowling Bowling Parking Parking.
 Cheekface recorded a cover version for the 2020 charity album Jesus Christ Supermarket: A Compilation to Celebrate 25 Years of Green Day’s Insomniac. The compilation's title references a title that was considered for Insomniac, but not used.

References

Green Day songs
1996 singles
Song recordings produced by Rob Cavallo
Songs written by Billie Joe Armstrong
1996 songs
Songs written by Tré Cool
Songs written by Mike Dirnt
Reprise Records singles
Music videos directed by Roman Coppola